Shekhan may refer to:

 Sheikhan, a city in Pakistan
 Al-Shikhan, a district and city in the Ninewa Governorate of Iraq
 Shekhan District, a district in the Ninewa Governorate of Iraq